Le Morne Brabant  is a peninsula at the extreme southwestern tip of the Indian Ocean island of Mauritius on the western side of the island. There are many caves and overhangs on the steep slopes. It is largely surrounded by a lagoon and is a well known tourist attraction. It is also a refuge for two rare plants, the Mandrinette and the Boucle d'Oreille. The peninsula of Le Morne benefits from a micro-climate. The mountain is named after the VOC-ship (Dutch East India Company) Brabant that ran aground there on 29 December 1783 on the cliffs.

Le Morne Brabant Mountain was submitted to the candidate list of the World Heritage Sites in 2003. In 2008, the nomination process concluded when UNESCO inscribed the site on the World Heritage List.

Peninsula

The peninsula is steeped in cultural myth and legend in the early 19th century as a suggested refuge for Maroons and people who escaped slavery. After the abolition of slavery in Mauritius, on 1 February 1835 it is rumored that a police expedition was dispatched there ostensibly to inform those who escaped slavery that emancipation had made them legally free men and women. The arrival of the police at the base of the mountain was (according to legend) misinterpreted by the former slaves who had scrambled to the summit (fearing that they were to be arrested and re-enslaved) and subsequently elected to leap to their deaths from the rock and die by suicide by landing in the ocean, rather than be recaptured back into slavery. Since 1987 the date is celebrated (particularly by Mauritian creoles) as the Annual Commemoration of the Abolition of Slavery.

Le Morne has been declared a World Heritage Site. The monument includes an inscription of this extract from the poem "Le Morne Territoire Marron" by Richard Sedley Assonne; "There were hundreds of them, but my people the maroons chose the kiss of death over the chains of slavery."

Cultural and aesthetic impact 

Le Morne highlights the historical significance of slavery.

Further reading 
Dominique Auzias, Jean-Paul Labourdette: Maurice, Rodrigues Le Petit futé. Country guide  (Online) 
Rosabelle Boswell: Le Malaise Créole: Ethnic Identity in Mauritius Berghahn Books, 2006.

Notes

External links 

Le Morne Cultural Landscape UNESCO Collection on Google Arts and Culture
Le Morne Brabant: The heritage of the Mauritian nation 
UNESCO World Heritage Centre – Le Morne Brabant
Le Morne Heritage Trust Fund
Views from La Rose des Vents – Le Morne Brabant   

Mountains of Mauritius
Peninsulas of Africa
World Heritage Sites in Mauritius